Baltake may refer to:

Joe Baltake, American film critic and film historian
 Baltakė, short feminine form of the Liuhuanian surname Baltakis